Villiersicus is a genus of beetles in the family Cerambycidae, containing the following species:

 Villiersicus fulvus Vives, 2005
 Villiersicus longicornis Vives, 2005

References

Dorcasominae